Oleksandr Bondarenko is Ukrainian name with surname of Bondarenko.

It may refer to:

 Oleksandr Bondarenko (footballer, 1966), Ukrainian footballer from Zaporizhzhia
 Oleksandr Bondarenko (footballer, 1989), Ukrainian footballer from Kiev
 Oleksandr Bondarenko (politician) (born 1987), Ukrainian politician
 Aleksandr Bondarenko (footballer, 1954), Soviet-Kyrgyzstani footballer from Bishkek